Jan Andrzej Sobociński (born 20 March 1999) is a Polish professional footballer who plays as a centre-back for Major League Soccer club Charlotte FC.

Career 
On 16 February 2021, Major League Soccer expansion side Charlotte FC announced Sobociński would join the club ahead of the 2022 season. In July, he officially joined the American team and was loaned back to ŁKS Łódź for the rest of 2021.

Career statistics

References 

1999 births
Living people
Footballers from Łódź
Polish footballers
Poland youth international footballers
Poland under-21 international footballers
Association football defenders
ŁKS Łódź players
Gryf Wejherowo players
Charlotte FC players
Ekstraklasa players
I liga players
II liga players
Major League Soccer players
Polish expatriate footballers
Expatriate soccer players in the United States
Polish expatriate sportspeople in the United States